The 1919–20 Army Cadets men's basketball team represented United States Military Academy during the 1919–20 intercollegiate men's basketball season. The head coach was Joseph O'Shea, coaching his first season with the Cadets. The team captain was Maurice Daniel.

Schedule

|-

References

Army Black Knights men's basketball seasons
Army
Army Cadets Men's Basketball Team
Army Cadets Men's Basketball Team